Kenneth Cartwright Patty (December 2, 1891 – March 27, 1967) was a Virginia lawyer who served as the 27th Attorney General of Virginia.  Patty was an assistant attorney general before Governor Thomas Stanley appointed him after the resignation of his boss, J. Lindsay Almond.  

Almond was member of the Democratic political organization led by Senator Harry F. Byrd, and he stepped down to run for Governor during the Massive Resistance crisis in Virginia. Patty's tenure at that position ended after Albertis Harrison, elected during that same 1957 election, took office.

Personal life
Kenneth Patty was born in Parrottsville, Tennessee, where his father, Rev. William Monroe Petty, served at Harned's Chapel. His mother, the former Minnie Bushong, bore at least 3 sons (one of whom, Graydon Patty, became a minister like his father) and 3 daughters. An ancestor served in the American Revolutionary War. The family subsequently moved to Tazewell, Virginia. Patty attended Washington and Lee University Law School, graduating in 1918. Patty married Ruth Friend Lacy (1892-1967) and had a daughter.

Patty died in 1967 and is buried at Forest Lawn cemetery in Richmond, Virginia.

1891 births
1967 deaths
Virginia Attorneys General
Virginia Democrats
Virginia lawyers
Washington and Lee University School of Law alumni
20th-century American lawyers
People from Cocke County, Tennessee